Jiří Lábus (born 26 January 1950, in Prague) is a Czech actor.  His brother is the Czech architect Ladislav Lábus.

In 1973, he graduated from the Academy of Performing Arts in Prague and joined the theatre Studio Ypsilon, where he remains employed to this day. He also appeared several times as guest actor in other theatres (National Theatre, 
Theatre Viola, Theatre Ungelt).

He performed several roles in both television and film. He gained 
popularity in Germany for his role of evil wizard Rumburak in the TV series Arabela. In the 1980s, he gave his voice to a stuffed moderator called Jů in the popular children's TV show Studio Kamarád. He also gave his voice to Marge Simpson in the Czech adaptation of The Simpsons, to the narrator of TV series M.A.S.H., and to ground sloth Sid in Ice Age.

Together with Oldřich Kaiser, he performed as a comedy duo "Kaiser a Lábus", which, in particular, took part in the TV comedy shows Ruská ruleta (Russian Roulette, 1994) and Možná přijde i kouzelník ("Perhaps a Magician Will Come Too", 1982).

Selected performances 
2005 – The referee in Ivánek, my friend (Ivánku, kamaráde. Based on wiretrapped phone calls, revealing bribery in Czech soccer)
2003 – Edgar in Play Strindberg by Friedrich Dürrenmatt, Divadlo Ungelt, winner of an unofficial poll organized by portal i-divadlo
1996 – Antoine Boneau in Tete de Meduse by Boris Vian, received Thálie Award
1991 – Casanova in Mozart in Prague
Kecal in The Bartered Bride
Celestin in Mam'zelle Nitouche

Selected filmography 
2018 – Goblin 2
2012 Goat Story with Cheese – 3D animated movie (Goat character)
2008 Goat Story – The Old Prague Legends 3D animated movie (Goat character)
2006 – I Served the King of England
2001 - Mach a Sebestova
1996 – Forgotten Light (Zapomenuté světlo)
1994 – Amerika, received Czech Lion Award as best supporting actor
1993 – Arabela se vrací ("Arabela Returns")
1984 – Rumburak
1983 - Warm Greetings around the World
1979 – Arabela (TV series)
1977 – Tomorrow I'll Wake Up and Scald Myself with Tea

References

External links

Jiří Lábus on Česko-Slovenská filmová databáze (Czechoslovak film database)
 Jiří Lábus on Filmová databáze (Film database)

Czech male television actors
Czech male film actors
Czech male stage actors
Czech male voice actors
Male actors from Prague
1950 births
Living people
Academy of Performing Arts in Prague alumni
Czech monarchists
Czech Lion Awards winners
Recipients of the Thalia Award